This is a list of seasons played by Atlético Madrid Femenino, Atlético Madrid's women's section in Spanish and European football, from the creation of its original incarnation, Atlético Villa de Madrid, to the latest completed season.

Key

 Rank = Final position
 P = Played
 W = Games won
 D = Games drawn
 L = Games lost
 F = Goals for
 A = Goals against
 GD = Goal difference
 Pts = Points

 CdR = Copa de la Reina
 SdE = Supercopa de España Femenina
 Europe = UEFA international competitions
 R32 = Round of 32
 R16 = Round of 16
 QF = Quarter-finals
 SF = Semi-finals
 RU = Runners-Up
 W = Champions
 GS = Group stage

Summary

 References: Futbolme,Soccerway,

References

women's seasons
 
Atlético Madrid Women
Atlético Madrid
Femenino Seasons
Atletico